Myrmex chevrolatii is a species of antlike weevil in the beetle family Curculionidae. It is found in North America.

References

Further reading

 
 

Curculioninae
Articles created by Qbugbot
Beetles described in 1873
Beetles of North America